The River Kenwater or simply Kenwater is a short anabranch of the River Lugg, i.e. it splits from and later re-joins that river.

References

External links

Kenwater